Brian Gordon is an American cartoonist, and creator of the webcomics Fowl Language, Frankie Fearless, and Chuck & Beans.

Chuck & Beans
Gordon worked as a cartoonist at Hallmark Cards for 18 years. While at Hallmark Cards, Gordon maintained a blog its web site called Brian's Brain.

Gordon used many different cartoon characters on the blog. People particularly loved the unnamed rabbit and dog characters. Gordon originally considered naming the characters Frank and Beans, but he discovered that name was already being used for a pornography web site. When Gordon mentioned the name to his wife, she thought he had said Chucking Beans, which gave him the idea to name the characters Chuck and Beans, and the name was set.

Gordon started drawing Chuck & Beans, a comic strip about a rabbit and a dog in their 20s who were obsessed with pop culture and dating. The characters appeared on many Hallmark greeting cards.

Fowl Language
Amidst Hallmark Cards' financial troubles, Gordon's friends urged him to create a new comic that he owned. Gordon was also finding it increasingly difficult to write comic strips for characters who were single and in their 20s while he was in a different stage of life. In July 2013, Gordon started a new comic, Fowl Language, as an outlet to vent about parenthood in a way that was edgier than Hallmark Cards would allow. The first comic strip began with four expletives, partly in order to draw a bright line between the new comic and Gordon's more family-friendly work at Hallmark Cards.

With ducks as all of the characters, the comic focuses on the frustrations and failures of parenthood. Rather than pretend that parenthood is easy or a competition, Gordon's cartoons openly depict how raising kids is a struggle filled with both wins and losses. Gordon said he chose to draw the characters as ducks because ducks were one of the few animals he did not draw very often for Hallmark Cards.

Hallmark sent Gordon an email notifying him of his lay off on June 1, 2015. Two hours later, The Huffington Post contacted Gordon asking to publish some of his comics on their website. The comics and accompanying article increased the reach of his work.

Fowl Language quickly became one of the most shared comics on Facebook. Gordon's online popularity led to several offers to publish his comics as a paperback; Andrews McMeel Publishing released Fowl Language: Welcome to Parenting, a compilation of Gordon's comics, on March 22, 2016. In the introduction, Gordon says that every parent is scared and makes it all up as they go along.

Calvin and Hobbes, Peanuts, The Far Side, and Bloom County were some of the newspaper comic strips that influenced Gordon from an early age.  Gordon cites The Oatmeal, Lunarbaboon, We the Robots, Heart and Brain, Sarah's Scribbles, Up and Out, and Owl Turd as some of the webcomics that inspire him more recently.

Personal life
Gordon was raised in Brockton, Massachusetts. Gordon wanted to be a syndicated comic artist from a young age.

Gordon graduated from Massachusetts College of Art and Design. After freelancing for some time, Gordon earned a master's degree from Syracuse University in 1997.

Gordon moved to Kansas for a three-week internship for Hallmark Cards in 1997, which was followed with an offer of employment. Gordon worked for Hallmark for 18 years.

Gordon lives with his wife and their four children in Westwood, Kansas. Gordon's children inspire the material for Fowl Language.

References

External links
  official web site
  at TinyView
  at GoComics
  at TinyView
  comic strip archive

American webcomic creators
Artists from Kansas
Artists from Massachusetts
Hallmark Cards people
Hallmark Cards artists
Living people
Massachusetts College of Art and Design alumni
People from Brockton, Massachusetts
People from Johnson County, Kansas
Syracuse University alumni
Year of birth missing (living people)